Obiora Udechukwu (born 1946) is a Nigerian painter and poet.

Biography
Born in Onitsha in 1946 to parents from Agulu in Anambra State, Nigeria, he studied for one year at Ahmadu Bello University before transferring to the University of Nigeria, Nsukka as a result of pogroms against the Igbo people in northern Nigeria. During the Nigerian Civil War, also known as the Biafran War (1967–1970), Udechukwu worked in the Propaganda Unit, and participated in the artists and writers workshops led by the poet Gabriel Okara and the artist Uche Okeke. At the end of the war, he returned to Nsukka, completing his bachelor's degree in fine arts, with a thesis on Igbo Uli mural art, in 1972. In 1973, he was appointed a Junior Fellow in the Department of Fine Arts, where he received his Master of Fine Arts in 1977. He is recognized as a leading member of the Nsukka School, originally led by Uche Okeke who served as head of the art program until 1985. While at Nsukka, Udechukwu became a founding member of the Aka Circle of Exhibiting Artists, which included El Anatsui, Tayo Adenaike, and other artists based in eastern Nigeria. He served on the editorial board of Okike: African Journal of New Writing established in Nsukka by the novelist Chinua Achebe. He was appointed Professor of Painting at Nsukka in 1986. During his tenure, his students included Tayo Adenaike, Olu Oguibe, Chika Okeke-Agulu, Marcia Kure, and Sylvester Okwunodu Ogbechie. In 1997, Udechukwu became Dana Professor of Fine Arts at St. Lawrence University, in New York State. He retired in 2018 and lives in Carson, CA.

Udechukwu frequently incorporates uli into his work which he learned from Uche Okeke, and in the 1970s he introduced nsibidi signs, as well as ink wash techniques of Chinese literati artists. Many of his paintings and prints depict ordinary people; his wartime service also inspired pieces that depicted the great suffering that he saw. From the mid-1970s, his themes ranged from philosophical subjects to socio-political commentary.

Art exhibitions
Udechukwu has had more than 25 one-person exhibitions in Nigeria, England, Zimbabwe, Germany, and United States.

Public collections
His art work is in the collections of National Gallery of Modern Art, Lagos; National Council of Arts and Culture, Lagos; Centre for Cultural Studies, University of Lagos; Iwalewa-Haus, University of Bayreuth, Germany; Museum fur Volkderkunde, Frankfurt/Main, Germany; Bradford City Museums and Galleries, Bradford, England; Smithsonian National Museum of African Art, Washington, DC; Newark Museum of Art, USA.

Poetry
 What the Madman Said, (1990), winner of Association of Nigerian Authors Poetry Prize, 1990.

Further reading
 Chika Okeke-Agulu, Obiora Udechukwu: Line, Image, Text (Milan: Skira Editore, 2016)
 Kristen Windmuller-Luna, “A Nigerian Song literatus: Chinese literati painting concepts from the Song Dynasty in the contemporary art of Obiora Udechukwu,” Rutgers Art Review Vol. 29, 2014
 Simon Ottenberg, Sources and themes in the art of Obiora Udechukwu, African Arts 35:2 (2002), 30–43, 91-92
 Chika Okeke-Agulu, “Obiora Udechukwu,” Nka: Journal of Contemporary African Art 9 (1998), 46–51.

Sources
 Bio from the National Museum of African Art, Washington D.C, 
 Profile of the poet, Sentinel Poetry
 Marie-Helene Boisdur de Toffol and others, An Anthology of African Art: The Twentieth Century, Distributed Art Publishers/Editions Revue Noire; English edition (2002),  - p. 249.

References

1946 births
Living people
Artists from Onitsha
Igbo painters
Nigerian painters
University of Nigeria alumni